North Perth is a suburb of Perth, Western Australia, located within the City of Vincent.

This old, established suburb three kilometres north of the Perth central business district is a place of mainly solid brick homes built from the early 1900s, many of which are now undergoing extensive renovations in line with the nationwide trend toward close-to-the-city living. It is home to various small shops and cafes, as well as the Rosemount Hotel. Beatty Park Leisure Centre was built (as Beatty Park Aquatic Centre) for the Perth Commonwealth Games in 1962 in Vincent Street.

North Perth is home to North Perth Primary School and Kyilla Primary School.  North Perth Primary School was established in 1899 and by 1921 was the largest primary school in the state.

According to the 2016 Census data, North Perth has a median age of 37 years, with 14.0% over the age of 65. The residents have a median personal income per week of $943, median household income of $2,074 and median family income of $2,616. This is a higher median income in all categories than Australia as a whole ($724, $1,910 and $1,595 respectively).

See also
 Electoral district of North Perth
 Municipality of North Perth

References

External links
 

 
Suburbs of Perth, Western Australia
Suburbs in the City of Vincent